Croatia competed at the 2020 Summer Olympics in Tokyo. Originally scheduled to take place from 24 July to 9 August 2020, the Games were postponed to 23 July to 8 August 2021, because of the COVID-19 pandemic. It was the nation's eighth consecutive appearance at the Summer Olympics.

Croatian squad of 59 athletes, the smallest delegation since Barcelona 1992, was named on 5 July 2021.

Medalists

Competitors
The following is the list of number of competitors participating in the Games:

Athletics

Croatian athletes further achieved the entry standards, either by qualifying time or by world ranking, in the following track and field events (up to a maximum of 3 athletes in each event):

Track & road events

Field events

Boxing

Croatia entered two boxers into the Olympic tournament. Youth Olympic medalist Luka Plantić (men's light heavyweight) and Nikolina Čačić (women's featherweight) secured spots by winning their quarterfinal and box-off matches, respectively, at the 2020 European Qualification Tournament in Villebon-sur-Yvette, France.

Canoeing

Slalom
Croatia qualified one canoeist for the men's C-1 class by finishing in the top eleven at the 2019 ICF Canoe Slalom World Championships in La Seu d'Urgell, Spain, marking the country's recurrence to the sport after an eight-year absence.

Sprint
Croatia qualified a single boat (women's K-1 500 m) for the Games by virtue of placing 2nd at the 2021 European Qualification Regatta in Szeged, Hungary. A further boat qualified (women's C-1 200 m) by virtue of winning the World Olympic Qualifier in Barnaul, Russia. This signified the first time that Croatia has qualified female canoeists.

Qualification Legend: FA = Qualify to final (medal); FB = Qualify to final B (non-medal)

Cycling

Road
Croatia received a spare berth, freed up by withdrawal of Sweden, to send one rider competing in the men's Olympic road race, as the highest-ranked nation for men, not yet qualified, in the UCI World Ranking.

Gymnastics

Artistic
Croatia entered two artistic gymnasts into the Olympic competition. Tin Srbić secured one of the two places available for individual-based gymnasts, neither part of the team nor qualified through the all-around, in the horizontal bar exercise at the 2019 World Championships in Stuttgart, Germany. On the women's side, Rio 2016 Olympian Ana Đerek received a spare berth from the apparatus event, as one of the twelve highest-ranked eligible gymnasts, not yet qualified, at the same tournament.

Men

Women

Judo

Croatia entered three female judokas into the Olympic tournament based on the International Judo Federation Olympic Qualification Rankings.

Karate
 
Croatia entered one karateka into the inaugural Olympic tournament. 2018 world champion Ivan Kvesić qualified directly for the men's kumite +75-kg category by finishing among the top four karateka at the end of the combined WKF Olympic Rankings.

Rowing

Croatia qualified two boats for each of the following rowing classes into the Olympic regatta. Rowing crews in the men's single sculls and men's coxless pair confirmed Olympic places for their boats at the 2019 FISA World Championships in Ottensheim, Austria

Qualification Legend: FA=Final A (medal); FB=Final B (non-medal); FC=Final C (non-medal); FD=Final D (non-medal); FE=Final E (non-medal); FF=Final F (non-medal); SA/B=Semifinals A/B; SC/D=Semifinals C/D; SE/F=Semifinals E/F; QF=Quarterfinals; R=Repechage

Sailing

Croatian sailors qualified one boat in each of the following classes through the 2018 Sailing World Championships, the class-associated Worlds, and the continental regattas.

M = Medal race; EL = Eliminated – did not advance into the medal race; STP = Standard Penalty (a penalty applied by the Race Committee); DSQ = Disqualification

Shooting

Croatian shooters achieved quota places for the following events by virtue of their best finishes at the 2018 ISSF World Championships, the 2019 ISSF World Cup series, European Championships or Games, and European Qualifying Tournament, as long as they obtained a minimum qualifying score (MQS) by May 31, 2020.

Swimming

Croatian swimmers further achieved qualifying standards in the following events (up to a maximum of 2 swimmers in each event at the Olympic Qualifying Time (OQT), and potentially 1 at the Olympic Selection Time (OST)):

Table tennis

Croatia entered three athletes into the table tennis competition at the Games. The men's team secured a berth by advancing to the quarterfinal round of the 2020 World Olympic Qualification Event in Gondomar, Portugal, permitting a maximum of two starters to compete in the men's singles tournament.

Taekwondo

Croatia entered three athletes into the taekwondo competition at the Games. Kristina Tomić (women's 49 kg) and Matea Jelić (women's 67 kg) qualified directly for their respective weight classes by finishing among the top five taekwondo practitioners at the end of the WT Olympic Rankings. With the 2019 World Taekwondo Grand Slam winner already qualified in the men's welterweight category (80 kg), 2018 European champion Toni Kanaet secured a third spot for the Croatian roster, as the next highest-placed eligible taekwondo practitioner in the rankings. Meanwhile, Ivan Šapina scored a semifinal victory in the men's heavyweight category (+80 kg) to book the remaining spot on the Croatian taekwondo squad at the 2021 European Qualification Tournament in Sofia, Bulgaria.

Tennis

Croatia qualified six tennis players.

Men

Women

Mixed

Water polo

Summary

Men's tournament

Croatian men's water polo team qualified for the Olympics by winning the third-place match against Russia by a penalty shot at the 2020 Men's Water Polo Olympic Qualification Tournament.

Team roster

Group play

Quarterfinal

Classification semifinal

Fifth place game

Wrestling

Croatia qualified two wrestlers for each of the following classes into the Olympic competition. One of them granted an Olympic license by advancing to the top two finals of the men's Greco-Roman 77 kg at the 2021 European Qualification Tournament in Budapest, Hungary, while another Croatian wrestler claimed one of the remaining slots in the men's Greco-Roman 87 kg at the 2021 World Qualification Tournament in Sofia, Bulgaria.

Greco-Roman

References

Nations at the 2020 Summer Olympics
2020
2021 in Croatian sport